Khusrabad may refer to:
 Khusrabad, Isfahan
 Khusrabad, South Khorasan